Tătărăuca Veche is a commune in Soroca District, Moldova. It is composed of six villages: Decebal, Niorcani, Slobozia Nouă, Tătărăuca Nouă, Tătărăuca Veche and Tolocănești.

Demographics

Village populations

 Tătărăuca Veche (village) 535
 Decebal 104 
 Niorcani 520 
 Slobozia Nouă 314
 Tătărăuca Nouă 443
 Tolocănești 78

Notable people
 Teodosie Bârcă
 Petre Popa
 Chiril Spinei
 Grigore Turcuman

References

Communes of Soroca District